Mária Lővey (born 15 June 1960) is a Hungarian gymnast. She competed in six events at the 1976 Summer Olympics.

References

1960 births
Living people
Hungarian female artistic gymnasts
Olympic gymnasts of Hungary
Gymnasts at the 1976 Summer Olympics
Sportspeople from Dunaújváros